The three-banded rosefinch (Carpodacus trifasciatus) is a species of finch in the family Fringillidae.

It is found in central China and far northeastern India. Its natural habitat is temperate forests.

The three banded rosefinch was also discovered in Arunachal Pradesh. The Indian species count reached 1340.

References

External links
Images at ADW

three-banded rosefinch
Birds of Central China
three-banded rosefinch
Taxonomy articles created by Polbot